Rashawn Ross (born January 16, 1979) is an American trumpeter and arranger from St. Thomas, US Virgin Islands. His contributions in the Dave Matthews Band as a touring member have gained him visibility. Ross is an accomplished session musician. Ross has worked with artists in many different genres of music ranging from funk, pop, rock, jazz, hip hop, gospel and country music. Some of the notable artists whom Ross has supported include Yerba Buena, Soulive, Lettuce, The 1975, and DJ Quik.

Career 

Ross attended the Berklee College of Music from 1996–2000. On June 18, 2005, Ross first appeared on stage with the Dave Matthews Band, performing "Louisiana Bayou" from the album Stand Up.  He continued to appear sporadically throughout 2005, with his workload increasing as the tour progressed. Initially, he joined the band on the road for the December 2005 final run of the tour, culminating in a 12-song appearance at the final stop of the tour. In 2006 Ross joined the band full-time on the road, performing at all full band tour dates of the year, as well as contributing backing vocals as his contributions increased by the tour's end. Ross has appeared at every performance since 2006 as trumpet player and background vocals. As of May 2018 Ross has appeared with the Dave Matthews Band for 672 shows. According to the Band's website, Rashawn has been a touring member of the band since 2005.

Session work 

Some of the other artists he has performed with include: The Fugees, Maceo Parker, Christian McBride, Chaka Khan, Stevie Wonder, Willie Nelson, The Edge, Rodney Jerkins, Christina Milan, Fred Hammond, Sean Paul, Roy Hargrove, Nicholas Payton, Questlove, Common, Pharoah Monch, Mark Batson, Robert Randolph, Doug E. Fresh, B Real, Chingy, Nate Dogg,  Kim Burrell, Richard Smallwood, Kelly Price, James Hall, Meshell Ndegeocello, The String Cheese Incident, MAGIC GIANT, Baaba Maal, Taj Mahal, Warren Haynes, Lettuce, Mike Green, Femi Kuti, Ariana Grande, The 1975, and Lady Gaga.

Discography

Soulive 
Break Out (2005)

With the Dave Matthews Band

Studio
Big Whiskey and the GrooGrux King (2009)
Away from the World (2012)
Come Tomorrow (2018)

LiveWeekend on the Rocks (2005)The Best of What's Around Vol. 1 (2006)Live Trax Vol. 06 (2006)Live at Piedmont Park (2007)Live Trax vol. 09 (2007)Live Trax vol. 10 (2007)Live Trax vol. 11 (2008)Live Trax vol. 13 (2008)Live Trax vol. 14 (2008)Live at Mile High Music Festival (2008)Live Trax vol. 15 (2009)Europe 2009 (2009)Live Trax vol. 19 (2010)Live in New York City (2010)Live In Atlantic CityLive at Wrigley Field (2011)Live Trax vol. 22 (2012)Live Trax vol. 25 (2013)Live Trax vol. 26 (2013)Live Trax vol. 27 (2013)Live Trax vol. 28 (2013)Live Trax vol. 29 (2014)Live Trax vol. 32 (2014)Live Trax vol. 35 (2015)Live Trax vol. 36 (2015)Live Trax vol. 42 (2017)Live Trax vol. 44'' (2017)

As a guest 
 Ninja Sex Party - "Smooth Talkin'"

References

External links 
Ross Rashawn on Instagram
 St. Thomas Source

American trumpeters
American male trumpeters
American music arrangers
Berklee College of Music alumni
Living people
1979 births
People from Saint Thomas, U.S. Virgin Islands
Dave Matthews Band members